Henkes or Henckes is a surname. Notable people with the surname include:

Jacques-Yves Henckes (born 1945), Luxembourgian jurist and politician
Kevin Henkes (born 1960), American children's book illustrator and author
Peter Henkes (born 1962), German former footballer

See also
Henkes Islands, Antarctica
Henke, a surname